Mercedes Beatriz Morán is an Argentine actress, known for her role in the television miniseries Culpables.

Career 
Morán has worked in several TV programs, such as Donde pueda quererte, Rosa de lejos, Por siempre amigos, Gasoleros, Culpables, Tiempo final, Mujeres asesinas, Amas de casa desesperadas, El hombre de tu vida, En terapia and La celebración. She worked on stage in plays such as El efecto de los rayos gamma, Locos de contentos, Humores que matan, Monólogos de la vagina, Pequeños crímenes conyugales, Agosto, Buena gente and La brisa de la vida. She worked in films such as Mirha de Liniers a Estambul, El Sur, La Ciénaga, Whisky Romeo Zulu, Luna de Avellaneda, The Motorcycle Diaries, Cordero de Dios, La ronda, Los Marziano and Betibú. 

She was the lead actress of Culpables in 2001, which was awarded the Golden Martín Fierro Award. That year she was nominated as best lead actress in miniseries, but did not receive the award. She had a cameo appearance in Graduados in 2012, which starred her daughter Mercedes Scápola. She played the mother of Scápola's character, the housekeeper "Clarita". Both of them work as regular actresses in the 2014 telenovela Guapas. She also had a scene with the actor Juan Leyrado, with subtle references to the 1998 telenovela Gasoleros. Both of them were the lead actors in it.

Personal life 
She married at 17 and with the disapproval of her parents. Mercedes Morán has three daughters. Mercedes Scápola and María Scápola 
from her first marriage with Oscar Scápola. Manuela is her daughter with the actor Oscar Martínez with whom she had a long relationship and she divorced in 2000.

Filmography

Television

Theater

Movies

Awards and nominations
 Argentine Film Critics Association Awards: Silver Condor; Best Supporting Actress, for La Ciénaga; 2002 (nom).
 Argentine Film Critics Association Awards: Silver Condor;  Best Actress, for Luna de Avellaneda; 2005 (nom).
 Argentine Film Critics Association Awards: Silver Condor; Best Actress, for Betibú; 2015 (nom).
 Argentine Film Critics Association Awards: Silver Condor; Best Actress, for Familia Sumergida; 2019 (won).
 Argentine Film Critics Association Awards: Silver Condor; Best Supporting Actress, for El Ángel; 2019 (nom).
 Karlovy Vary International Film Festival: Best Actress, for Sueño Florianópolis; 2018 (won).

Footnotes

External links
 
 

1955 births
Living people
People from San Luis Province
Argentine film actresses
Argentine stage actresses
Argentine telenovela actresses
Argentine television actresses